An electrically conductive adhesive is a glue that is primarily used for electronics.

The electric conductivity is caused by a component that makes ca. 80% of the total mass of an electrically conductive adhesive. This conductive component is suspended in a sticky component that holds the electrically conductive adhesive together. The particles of the conductive component are in contact to each other and in this way make electric current possible.

Composition
The conductive component can be silver, nickel, copper or graphite. Other conductive materials are possible but unusual. The adhesive component can be a varnish, synthetic resin, or silicone. Variations in conductive component's type and concentration change the resistivity of the adhesive. A typical silver-based conductive adhesive such as that made by Electrolube contains ingredients in the following proportions:

They are specifically formulated in paste (micro-particles) for use in scanning electron microscopy (SEM) and other electron optical applications find use in producing or repairing printed circuit board (PCB) tracks, to paint-on an electrical screen, or to make electrical connections to non-solderable surfaces.

Applications

 One could fix a defective conductor on a printed circuit board using an electrically conductive adhesive. In the same way, one could fix a defective rear windscreen heater on a car using an electrically conductive adhesive.
 If just a small current is needed, a temperature-sensitive electronic element can be electrically connected to a circuit using an electrically conductive adhesive instead of soldering.
 Electrically conductive adhesives can be used to paint the inner surface of plastic boxes containing electronic devices. This makes a Faraday cage saving the internal components from electromagnetic radiation. 
 Electrically conductive adhesives are used in SEM to fix and ground the sample to avoid electrostatic charging of the surface.

References

Further reading
 A. Pizzi, K.L. Mittal (2003). Handbook of Adhesive Technology page 855ff . Marcel Dekker Inc. 

Adhesives
Electrical conductors